Acidiella is a genus of tephritid  or fruit flies in the family Tephritidae.

Species 
Species accepted within Acidiella include:

 Acidiella abdominalis (Zia, 1938)
 Acidiella ambigua (Shiraki, 1933)
 Acidiella angustifrons (Hendel, 1927)
 Acidiella arisanica Shiraki, 1933
 Acidiella bimaculata (Hardy, 1987)
 Acidiella circumvaga (Ito, 1984)
 Acidiella consobrina (Zia, 1937)
 Acidiella contraria (Walker, 1853)
 Acidiella dilutata (Ito, 1984)
 Acidiella disjuncta (Ito, 1953)
 Acidiella diversa Ito, 1952
 Acidiella formosana (Shiraki, 1933)
 Acidiella funesta (Hering, 1938)
 Acidiella fuscibasis Hering, 1953
 Acidiella issikii (Shiraki, 1933)
 Acidiella japonica (Hendel, 1927)
 Acidiella kagoshimensis (Miyake, 1919)
 Acidiella lineata (Shiraki, 1933)
 Acidiella longipennis Hendel, 1914
 Acidiella maculata (Shiraki, 1933)
 Acidiella maculinotum (Hering, 1938)
 Acidiella maculipennis (Hendel, 1927)
 Acidiella malaisei (Hering, 1938)
 Acidiella pachypogon (Ito, 1984)
 Acidiella persimilis Hendel, 1915
 Acidiella pseudolineata (Hering, 1938)
 Acidiella rectangularis (Munro, 1935)
 Acidiella retroflexa (Wang, 1990)
 Acidiella rioxaeformis (Bezzi, 1913)
 Acidiella sapporensis (Shiraki, 1933)
 Acidiella scelesta (Hering, 1938)
 Acidiella sepulcralis Hering, 1938
 Acidiella spinifera (Hering, 1938)
 Acidiella trigenata (Munro, 1938)
 Acidiella turgida (Hering, 1939)
 Acidiella yasumatsui (Ito, 1949)

References

Trypetinae
Tephritidae genera